Carl Brown may refer to:

Carl Brown (discus thrower) (born 1970), American discus thrower
Carl Robert Brown (1930–1982), American teacher and mass murderer
Carl Brown (footballer) (born 1950), Jamaican football player and manager
L. Carl Brown (1928–2020), American professor of history

See also
Karl Brown (disambiguation)